Cáelbad (Cáelbhadh, Caolbhadh, Caolbhaidh), son of Cronn Badhraoi, a descendant of Mal mac Rochride, was, according to Lebor Gabála Érenn, a High King of Ireland for a period of one year. Inneacht daughter of Lughaidh was the mother of Caolbhaidh son of Cronn Badhraoi; and he was slain by Eochaid Mugmedon.  The chronology of Geoffrey Keating's Foras Feasa ar Éirinn dates his reign to 343–344, that of the Annals of the Four Masters to 356–357.

Genealogy
According to Foras Feasa ar Éirinn, Caolbhaidh was a son of Cronn Badhraoi, son of Eochaidh Cobha, son of Lughaidh, son of Rossa, son of Iomchaidh, son of Feidhlimidh, son of Cas, son of Fiachaidh Aruidhe, son of Aonghus Gaibhnionn, son of Fearghus Foghlas, son of Tiobraide Tireach, son of Breasal, son of Fearb, son of Mal, son of Rochruidhe, son of Cathbhadh, son of Giallchaidh, son of Cunnchaidh, son of Fionnchaidh, son of Muireadhach, son of Fiachaidh Fionnamhnus, son of Irial Glunmhar, son of Conall Cearnach of the race of Ir son of Milidh.
Furthermore, John O'Hart's Irish Genealogies gives the line of descent onwards from
Caolbhaidh descendant is his son:-
92.Feargan: his son 
93.Mongan: his son 
94.Fogartach: his son 
95.Cruinnieth: his son 
96.Artan: his son 
97.Cuinncon: his son 
98.Crum na Cruach: his son 
99.Croncruach: his son 
100.Eochaidh: his son 
101.Searran: his son 
102.Bugmaille: his son 
103.Ciannait: his son 
104.Gillcolum: his son 
105.Donall: his son 
106.Fionnach/Donoch: his son 
107.Shane/John: his son 
108.Tomhas: his son 
109.Tomhas Oge: his son 
110.Searran II: his son 
111.GiollaPadraic: his son 
112.GiollaPadraic Oge: his son 
113.Giolgagin: his son 
114.GiollaCollum: his son 
115.Eachmilidh I: his son 
116.Aodh/Hugh: his son 
117.Torlogh: his son 
118.Phelim: his son 
119.Eachmilidh II: his son 
120.Phelim II: his son
121.Patrick McCartan: his son 
122.John McCartan:(Left Ireland in the service of King James II) his son
123.Anthony McCartan: (Followed King James II and became a Captain in the French Brigade in France) his son
124.Antoine McCartan: (A Physician) his son
125.Andronicus McCartan: (A Medical Doctor) his son 
126.Felix McCartan of Lille.

Legends
The Macalister translation of Lebor Gabála Érenn says that Cáelbad was also King of Ulster when he killed Muiredach Tirech to take the Kingship. It also says that he took the kingship of Ireland for a space of one year, and exacted the Boroma, a cattle tax, without a battle. And he fell at the hands of Eochaid Mugmedon. Cáelbad also had a son, Fíachna Lonn mac Cóelbad, who was a King of the Dál nAraidi.

The Annals of the Four Masters, annal M356.1 says that after Muireadhach Tireach had been thirty years in the sovereignty of Ireland, he was slain by Caelbhadh, son of Crunn, King of Uladh, at Portrigh, over Dabhall. It goes on further to say in annal M357.1 that after Caelbhadh, son of Crunn Badhrai, had been one year in the sovereignty of Ireland, he was slain by Eochaidh Muighmheadhoin.

See also
Saran mac Cáelbad

References

Cruthin
Ulaid
Legendary High Kings of Ireland
4th-century Irish monarchs
4th-century Irish people